Leo Thethani (born 8 January 1999) is a South African professional football forward who plays for Cape Town Spurs.

Club career
Thethani, who played for several years in the Netherlands, made his Eerste Divisie debut for Jong Ajax on 10 September 2018 in a game against Jong AZ as a 78th-minute substitute for Danilo.

References

External links
 

1999 births
Living people
Soccer players from Cape Town
South African soccer players
Association football forwards
Jong Ajax players
Cape Town Spurs F.C. players
Eerste Divisie players
South African expatriate soccer players
Expatriate footballers in the Netherlands
South Africa under-20 international soccer players